KQBZ (96.9 FM) is a radio station licensed to Brownwood, Texas, United States, and serving the Brownwood area. The station is currently owned by Tackett-Boazman Broadcasting LP.

History
The station was assigned the call letters KXYL-FM on September 15, 1982. On June 15, 1985, the station changed its call sign to KISJ-FM, on February 4, 1991, to KXYL-FM, and, on July 1, 2010, to the current KQBZ. On April 28, 2006, the station was sold to Tackett.

References

External links
KQBZ FM 96.9 The Breeze

QBZ